Beaches—Woodbine was a provincial electoral district in Ontario, Canada. It was created in 1967 by merging the former ridings of Woodbine and Beaches.

Boundaries
The riding was created prior to the 1967 election by combining the ridings of Woodbine and Beaches. The boundaries of the new riding were as follows: From the southwest point where Coxwell Avenue met Lake Ontario the boundary followed Coxwell north to Queen Street East. It then went west a short distance to Rhodes Avenue. It followed Rhodes Avenue north to Danforth Avenue. It then went back east along Danforth to Coxwell. It then went north along Coxwell to the city limits. Along the north it followed the city limits until it reached Victoria Park Avenue. It then went south along Victoria Park and along the same line until it reached Lake Ontario.

In 1974 the eastern boundary with Riverdale was altered. The border now consisted of Coxwell Avenue from Lake Ontario north to the railway right-of-way just south of Hanson Street. The boundary followed the right-of-way west until Greenwood Avenue. It then went north along Greenwood until it met the city limits.

From 1987 to 1999 it consisted of Old Toronto east from where Leslie Street meets the lake north to Queen Street. It then followed Queen Street east to Greenwood Avenue and then north to the CN railway. Following the CN right of way to Coxwell Avenue it then went north to the city limits.

In 1999, it was absorbed into the new ridings of Beaches—East York and Toronto—Danforth.

Members of Provincial Parliament

Election results

References

Former provincial electoral districts of Ontario
Provincial electoral districts of Toronto
1996 disestablishments in Ontario